Villa Ridge is an unincorporated community and census-designated place (CDP) in Franklin County, Missouri, United States. The population was 2,636 at the 2010 census, up from 2,417 at the 2000 census.

History
A post office called Villa Ridge has been in operation since 1889. The community was named for a ridge near the town site, with villa meaning "town".

Geography
Villa Ridge is located in northeastern Franklin County. It is on Missouri Route M between Interstate 44 two miles to the south and Missouri Route 100 one mile north. Pacific is seven miles east and Union is six miles to the west.

Demographics

As of the census of 2000, there were 2.417 people, 869 households, and 678 families residing in the CDP. The racial makeup of the CDP was 95.66% White, 2.48% African American, 0.41% Native American, 0.33% Asian, 0.29% from other races, and 0.83% from two or more races. Hispanic or Latino of any race were 0.91% of the population.

There were 869 households, out of which 37.9% had children under the age of 18 living with them, 66.5% were married couples living together, 8.4% had a female householder with no husband present, and 21.9% were non-families. 17.3% of all households were made up of individuals, and 6.1% had someone living alone who was 65 years of age or older. The average household size was 2.78 and the average family size was 3.14.

In the CDP, the population was spread out, with 28.5% under the age of 18, 7.2% from 18 to 24, 31.4% from 25 to 44, 22.1% from 45 to 64, and 10.8% who were 65 years of age or older. The median age was 35 years. For every 100 females, there were 97.6 males. For every 100 females age 18 and over, there were 98.1 males.

The median income for a household in the CDP was $45,045, and the median income for a family was $46,762. Males had a median income of $41,875 versus $20,441 for females. The per capita income for the CDP was $18,378. About 1.8% of families and 4.7% of the population were below the poverty line, including .46% of those under age 18 and 99% of those age 65 or over.

References

Census-designated places in Franklin County, Missouri
Census-designated places in Missouri